Nirvana Kanda is an ancient Prakrit Jain composition  that describes the sacred sites where Jain sages have attained Nirvana. It is also termed Nirvana Bhakti.

In inscription of 13th century  that describes the construction of the Kirti Stambha at Chittor  gives 10 shlokas that give a rendering in Sanskrit.   
A Hindi rendering Nirvana Kanda Bhasha was composed by Bhaiya Bhagvatidaas in Samvat 1741.

It is popularly recited on many occasions.

Author
It is traditionally attributed to Acharya Kundakunda who is regarded to be the author of several Prakrit texts like Samayasar.

Contents

The text include:
 Nirvana sites of 24 tirthankaras (Ashtapad Mount, Champapuri, Girnar, Pawapuri and Samet Shikhar)

The words "अट्ठावयम्मि उसहो" also occur in Tiloyapannatti.
 Nirvana sites of other Kevalias including Shatrunjaya

See also 
Tirth Pat
 Vividha Tirtha Kalpa
 Jainism in Delhi
 Shatrunjaya

References

Jain texts